Vishweshwar Bhat is a journalist in Karnataka, India and an author of 83 books in Kannada language. He was the editor of Vijaya Karnataka and Kannada Prabha newspapers and the television channel Suvarna News. He started a media house in Karnataka by name Vishwakshara Media Pvt. Ltd. as Managing Director with Sri KP Nanjundi. He is the Editor in Chief of the Kannada daily Vishwavani which was relaunched on 15 January 2016 all over Karnataka, prior to which it was being published and circulated only in Hubballi, headed by renowned Kannada writer Patil Puttappa. Vishweshwar Bhat is a recipient of Zee Kannada Hemmeya Kannadiga Awards to felicitate achievers in their respective fields. He was also the recipient of Rajyotsava Awards conferred by Government of Karnataka for his achievements as a journalist in the year 2005.

Vishweshwar Bhat hails from Murur, Kumta taluk, Uttara Kannada district of Karnataka. He completed his primary schooling in Tudaguni and secondary schooling in Goli. A recipient of 4 Gold medals over the course of his postgraduation in Geology and MA in Journalism, he had a brief stint working as an Assistant professor at Asian College of Journalism and also as an Officer on Special Duty to Late Ananth Kumar, Minister of Tourism and Culture during the Vajpayee government.

In early 2011, Bhat became the editor-in-chief of the newspaper Kannada Prabha, where he had previously served for four years as a sub-editor. Bhat had resigned from VK at the end of 2010, stating he intended to pursue higher studies, and had started a blog. 

He has written 83 books in Kannada. Over the past 25 years, he has been regularly writing two columns a week and other articles for Kannada Newspapers. Janagala Mana, Noorentu Nota, Noorentu Vishwa, Noorentu Maatu, Daarideepokti, Vakratundokti, Ide Antaranga Suddi, Sampadakara Sabhyashodhane, Ask The Editor are amongst his famous columns. His witty answers to the questions of the readers through his popular daily column Bhattar-Scotch is well received by Kannadigas. He has also written various columns under the pen names: Swami Anamadeya Poorna, Suddeesha, Bana Bhatta, Gunda Bhatta, etc. to name a few.   

Recently, one of his articles has been adopted for a Kannada Movie 'Tanuja', directed by Harish M D Halli in which he has also acted in the role of an editor.

His hobbies include Photography and Cricket.

Vishweshwar Bhat also leads a team that has successfully completed more than 500 sessions in Clubhouse under a group named ‘Vishwavani Club’ focusing on topics from different fields.   

The tech-savvy editor is also very active in social media like Twitter, Facebook and Instagram.

In August 2012, Bhat was allegedly one of the journalists who was being targeted by terror suspects.

References

Indian newspaper editors
Kannada-language journalists
Living people
Journalists from Karnataka
Indian male journalists
1966 births
Recipients of the Rajyotsava Award 2005